The 1933 Philadelphia Athletics season involved the A's finishing third in the American League with a record of 79 wins and 72 losses. Jimmie Foxx became the first player to win two American League MVP Awards.

Regular season 
 August 14, 1933: Jimmie Foxx hit for the cycle. Part of the cycle included hitting a grand slam. During a two-week span, Mickey Cochrane, Jimmie Foxx and Pinky Higgins all hit for the cycle during the season.

Season standings

Record vs. opponents

Roster

Player stats

Batting

Starters by position 
Note: Pos = Position; G = Games played; AB = At bats; H = Hits; Avg. = Batting average; HR = Home runs; RBI = Runs batted in

Other batters 
Note: G = Games played; AB = At bats; H = Hits; Avg. = Batting average; HR = Home runs; RBI = Runs batted in

Pitching

Starting pitchers 
Note: G = Games pitched; IP = Innings pitched; W = Wins; L = Losses; ERA = Earned run average; SO = Strikeouts

Other pitchers 
Note: G = Games pitched; IP = Innings pitched; W = Wins; L = Losses; ERA = Earned run average; SO = Strikeouts

Relief pitchers 
Note: G = Games pitched; W = Wins; L = Losses; SV = Saves; ERA = Earned run average; SO = Strikeouts

Farm system

References

External links
1933 Philadelphia Athletics team page at Baseball Reference
1933 Philadelphia Athletics team page at www.baseball-almanac.com

Oakland Athletics seasons
Philadelphia Athletics season
Oakland